Buddhadasa was King of Anuradhapura in the 4th century, whose reign lasted from 341 to 370. He succeeded his father Jettha Tissa II as King of Anuradhapura and was succeeded by his son Upatissa I. He pioneered in building many hospitals in the country. Mahavamsa describes Buddhadasa as a "Mind of Virtue and an Ocean of Gems." and he is known for his medical knowledge.

See also
 List of Sri Lankan monarchs
 History of Sri Lanka

References

External links
 Kings & Rulers of Sri Lanka
 Codrington's Short History of Ceylon

Monarchs of Anuradhapura
B
B
B
Sri Lankan Ayurvedic practitioners